Stephen C. Belichick (born March 25, 1987) is an American football coach who is the outside linebackers coach for the New England Patriots of the National Football League (NFL).

Early years
Belichick played lacrosse at The Rivers School in Weston, Massachusetts, and was an All-League Honorable Mention selection in his senior year. He then attended Rutgers University where he continued to play lacrosse as a defenseman and long-stick midfielder (LSM) from 2008 through 2011. He also played for Rutgers Football under coach Greg Schiano in 2011 as a long snapper.

Coaching career

New England Patriots
On May 10, 2012, Belichick was hired by the New England Patriots as a coaching assistant, a position in which he would serve for four seasons before being named safeties coach prior to the start of the 2016 season. He won his first Super Bowl when the Patriots defeated the Seattle Seahawks in Super Bowl XLIX.

On February 5, 2017, Belichick was part of the Patriots coaching staff that won Super Bowl LI. In the game, the Patriots defeated the Atlanta Falcons by a score of 34–28 in overtime.

For the 2019 season, after long-time assistant Brian Flores left to become the new head coach of the Miami Dolphins, Belichick assumed defensive play calling duties previously held by Flores while also operating as the team's secondary coach. He won his third Super Bowl title when the Patriots defeated the Los Angeles Rams in Super Bowl LIII.

On July 28, 2020 it was announced that Belichick would move from safeties coach to outside linebackers coach, with his brother Brian taking over at safeties.

Personal life
Belichick is the son of current New England Patriots head coach Bill Belichick, and the grandson of Steve Belichick. His younger brother, Brian Belichick, also works in the New England Patriots organization, currently serving as the team's safeties coach.

References

External links
 New England Patriots profile

1987 births
Living people
People from Ridgewood, New Jersey
Sportspeople from Bergen County, New Jersey
People from Weston, Massachusetts
Sportspeople from Middlesex County, Massachusetts
Rutgers Scarlet Knights men's lacrosse players
Rutgers University alumni
New England Patriots coaches
Rutgers Scarlet Knights football players
Coaches of American football from Massachusetts
Belichick family
Rivers School alumni